Théo Becker Oliveira (born November 24, 1976) is a Brazilian actor, model and singer.

Biography 
Theo was born in Pelotas, where he began surfing at the age of 6 under the influence of his father. He began working as a model in Rio de Janeiro in November 2001, and starred on the cover of G Magazine. His TV debut was at the program Paquito Planet Xuxa. After that, he acted in soap operas like Family Ties and Desires of Women and in a teenage series, Malhação.

He was invited by James Santiago and Rossano Herval to star in the remake of the novel The Slave Isaura, Rede Record. He also acted in the soap operas Proof of Love, The Ways of the Heart, and Os Mutantes - Caminhos do Coração. During his performances he composed several songs, including Marks in the Sand, Adriana (who was later titled Andressa Oliveira), and Fast.

He was knighted in 2008 by the City Council in Pelotas (RS), his hometown.

Oliveira also participated in the first edition of the reality show A Fazenda in 2009. He was considered as the most "controversial" participant in the history of reality shows in Brazil. His participation earned high ratings for Rede Record. He was eliminated in the third week of the show. His elimination was due to several fights with the participants and his moments of emotional disarray, which ended up giving him more notoriety. After leaving the program, he signed a four-year contract with the broadcaster.

Currently, he performs with his band, where they play classics of the 1980s and feature original compositions.

References

External links

Official blog 
Official Theo and the Beckers

1976 births
Living people
People from Pelotas
Brazilian people of German descent
Brazilian people of Portuguese descent
Brazilian male television actors
Brazilian male models
21st-century Brazilian male singers
21st-century Brazilian singers
The Farm (TV series) contestants